Bob Blue (July 31, 1948 – March 17, 2006), a native of Huntington, NY and a resident of Massachusetts, was a teacher and songwriter. His most well-known song, The Ballad of Erica Levine, was occasionally performed by Mary Travers of Peter, Paul and Mary.

Bob was a member of the band "The Nice Jewish Boys" and one of the founders of the Children's Music Network.

There is a photo of Bob and a recording of Bob in the Children's Music Network Blog at https://web.archive.org/web/20150908021519/http://www.cmnonline.org/magic-penny/2004-bob-blue.htm

Songs that Bob wrote include "I Did It Their Way", which is a parody of the horrors of academic life sung to
the tune of "I Did It My Way".
 
It is on his cassette tape of the same name (a re-issuing of an LP called "Erica
Levine and Friends").   The song is also available on "Keepers 2", a collection album put out by
Minnesota  Public Radio and sung by Court Dorsey of "Bright Morning Star."   The original of this version is
on Bright Morning Stars  "Sweet and Sour", FLying Fish Records, FF-478.  It's also been heard Michael Cooney, "Fraser Union" out of Vancouver, BC. and Roy Bailey at the Australian National Folk Festival, Easter 1996.

Bob had multiple sclerosis in the last years of his life, and died from it in his home at Amherst, Massachusetts in 2006.

In 2010, Bob Blue's Daughter, Katy Blue, bicycled across the United States (from Vermont to Seattle, Washington) to raise money for the National MS Society.

External links 
Bob Blue's web site
Bob Blue Memorial Bike Ride Web Site

American male singer-songwriters
American folk singers
Jewish American musicians
American singer-songwriters
1948 births
2006 deaths
Neurological disease deaths in Massachusetts
Deaths from multiple sclerosis
20th-century American singers
20th-century American male singers
20th-century American Jews
21st-century American Jews